Lecanactis abietina is a species of lichen belonging to the family Roccellaceae.

References

Roccellaceae